Sir Jeffrey Philip Tate  (28 April 19432 June 2017) was an English conductor of classical music.  Tate was born with spina bifida and had an associated spinal curvature.  After studying medicine at the University of Cambridge and beginning a medical career in London, he switched to music and worked under Georg Solti at the Royal Opera House, Covent Garden, before making his conducting debut in 1979 at the Metropolitan Opera, New York.  He held conducting appointments with the English Chamber Orchestra, Rotterdam Philharmonic Orchestra and Hamburg Symphony Orchestra, among others, and was the first person to be appointed principal conductor of the Royal Opera House.  He was knighted for his services to music in 2017.

Early life
Tate was born in Salisbury, England, with spina bifida, a major birth defect, and also had an associated spinal curvature, kyphosis. His family moved to Farnham, Surrey, when he was young and he attended Farnham Grammar School between 1954 and 1961, gaining a State Scholarship to Cambridge University, where he directed theatre productions. Tate initially read medicine at Christ's College, Cambridge (1961–64), specializing in eye surgery.  He later worked at St Thomas's Hospital, London, before giving up his clinical career to study music at the London Opera Centre from 1970-71. He became a repetiteur and a coach at the Royal Opera House, Covent Garden, under the tutelage of Sir Georg Solti.

Career
Tate was musical assistant to Pierre Boulez for the centenary production of The Ring at Bayreuth in 1976, also working with the conductor on Lulu for the historic 1979 production at the Paris Opéra which restored Act 3.
Tate's international conducting début was in Carmen at the Gothenburg Opera in 1978. He conducted the Metropolitan Opera in New York City in 1979. His range at the Royal Opera House encompassed Mozart (La clemenza di Tito in 1982, Così fan tutte in 1989, Le nozze di Figaro in 1991, Idomeneo in 1989), Strauss (Ariadne auf Naxos in 1985, Der Rosenkavalier in 1989, Arabella in 1990), Wagner (Lohengrin in 1988, Der fliegende Holländer in 2011) and French repertoire (Manon in 1987, Les Contes d'Hoffmann in 1991, Carmen in 1994).

In 1985, he was appointed the first principal conductor of the English Chamber Orchestra (ECO), with which group he undertook a recording of 51 symphonies by Mozart for EMI in the 1980s, and held the post until 2000.  Other recordings with the ECO included late symphonies of Haydn, and a Mozart piano concerto cycle with Mitsuko Ushida. In 1982 he won the 'Outstanding First Achievement of the Year in Opera' for conducting Mozart's La Clemenza di Tito, at the Royal Opera House in June 1981, in the SWET (now Olivier) Awards.  In September 1986, Tate became principal conductor of the Royal Opera House, Covent Garden, the first person in the company's history to have that title.  He held this Covent Garden post until 1991, and subsequently became principal guest conductor at Covent Garden from 1991 to 1994.  He was principal conductor of the Rotterdam Philharmonic Orchestra from 1991 to 1995.  In 2005, Tate was appointed music director of the San Carlo Theatre of Naples, remaining in the post until 2010. He created the Rolf Liebermann opera La Forêt, based on Ostrovsky's The Forest, in Geneva in April 1987. He conducted the Ring at the Théâtre du Châtelet in Paris in 1994,

In October 2007, the Hamburg Symphony Orchestra announced the appointment of Tate as its next chief conductor. He formally took up the post in 2009. In February 2014, the orchestra announced the extension of his contract as chief conductor until 2019.  He held the Hamburg post until his death on 2 June 2017. Tate was principal guest conductor and artistic adviser of the Adelaide Symphony Orchestra, in part as a result of his association with the orchestra from a 1998 production of the Ring, from 2016 until his death.

The Opera magazine obituary noted that his "recordings, notably of Lulu, Hänsel und Gretel and Elektra, demonstrate his emotive power and continual care that the singing should never be drowned by the pit".

Tate's recordings include a series of Mozart piano concertos with Dame Mitsuko Uchida.  Tate was president of UK Spina Bifida charity ASBAH (now SHINE [Spina Bifida, Hydrocephalus, Information, Networking, Equality]) from 1989.  A portrait of Jeffrey Tate is in David Blum's book Quintet, Five Journeys toward Musical Fulfillment (Cornell University Press, 1999). It originally appeared as an article on 30 April 1990 issue of The New Yorker.

In private life, Tate was partners with Klaus Kuhlemann, a German geomorphologist, whom he met when conducting at Cologne from 1977. Tate has described this situation as being an outsider on two scores:

Tate and Kuhlemann eventually married.

Tate was made a Knight Bachelor in the 2017 New Year Honours for services to British music overseas.  He was also appointed a Commander of the Order of the British Empire (CBE) in the 1990 Birthday Honours.  Tate conducted his last concerts on 30 and 31 May 2017, in Bolzano and Trento, with the Haydn Orchestra.  He died of a heart attack in Bergamo, Lombardy, Italy, on 2 June 2017 at the age of 74.  Kuhlemann, his spouse, survives him.

Discography
As well as his Mozart cycles, his English Chamber Orchestra discography also includes English music by Bax, Bridge, Butterworth and Moeran, Verklärte Nacht, Metamorphosen, and the Missa Solemnis; he conducted the Canteloube Songs of the Auvergne for Kiri Te Kanawa in 1982 and 1983.

As a keyboard player he played organ for recordings of Vivaldi choral works in the 1970s, and was part of the continuo for Le nozze di Figaro in 1982, conducted by Georg Solti on Decca.

Videography
 The Metropolitan Opera Centennial Gala (1983), Deutsche Grammophon DVD, 00440-073-4538
 Recording of a live televised English Chamber Orchestra concert from the Schloss Schönbrunn, Vienna on 16 November 1990; Mozart: Symphony No.36 in C K425 “Linz”, Piano Concerto No.17 in G K453 (with Dezsö Ránki) and Symphony No.41 in C K551 “Jupiter”, issued in parts on laserdisc (Philips 070 141.1PHG), VHS (Philips 070 141.3PHG), DVD (ArtHaus Musik 100 081, EuroArts 201021.8, and Brilliant Classics 92819) and Blu-ray (EuroArts 200102.4).

References

External links
[ Biography from allmusic]
Pieces, 2002 (article in Christ's College newsletter)
 "Jeffrey Tate: 'You can't terrify people any more; you have to do it with love'".  The Guardian podcast with Christopher Cook, 13 October 2011
 Interview with Jeffrey Tate, 28 July 1982 Very early, at the beginning of his conducting career; much about Wagner and Tate's involvement with the Boulez Ring at Bayreuth.

1943 births
2017 deaths
Alumni of Christ's College, Cambridge
English conductors (music)
British male conductors (music)
Fellows of King's College London
People from Salisbury
People with spina bifida
English gay musicians
Knights Bachelor
Commanders of the Order of the British Empire
Laurence Olivier Award winners
20th-century English musicians
20th-century British conductors (music)
21st-century English musicians
21st-century British conductors (music)
Conductors (music) awarded knighthoods
20th-century English LGBT people
21st-century English LGBT people